Anon Samakorn (born 13 July 1998) is a Thai professional footballer who plays as a defensive midfielder for Thai League 2 club Kasetsart.

International career
In February 2019, He was selected in Thailand U23 squad for 2019 AFF U-22 Youth Championship in Cambodia.

Honours

International
Thailand U-23
 2019 AFF U-22 Youth Championship: Runners-up

Port
 Thai FA Cup (1) : 2019

References

External links
 
Anon Samakorn at Soccerway

1998 births
Living people
Anon Samakorn
Anon Samakorn
Anon Samakorn
Association football midfielders
Thai expatriate sportspeople in the United Kingdom
Anon Samakorn
Anon Samakorn